The Tichla Fortress is a fort in the Moroccan occupied Western Sahara.  It was built by the Spanish during their reign in Spanish Sahara in 1936.  During the Mauritanian campaign in Western Sahara, fighting was seen in the town of Tichla and the fortress.  Currently it is under Moroccan occupation in the disputed Western Sahara.

References 

Buildings and structures completed in 1936
1936 establishments in Morocco
Forts in Morocco
Buildings and structures in Western Sahara
20th-century architecture in Morocco